Events from the year 1937 in art.

Events

 January 9 – Leon Trotsky begins exile in Mexico with his wife Natalia Sedova; they share The Blue House in Coyoacán with painters Frida Kahlo and Diego Rivera and Trotsky has an affair with Frida.
 March 24 - National Gallery of Art in Washington, D.C., established by the United States Congress.
 May 1–June 4 – Pablo Picasso paints Guernica, a large cubistic monochrome oil painting created in reaction to the German bombing of the Spanish Basque town of the same name on 26 April. It is first exhibited in July at the Spanish Republican government pavilion (designed by Josep Lluís Sert) in the Exposition Internationale des Arts et Techniques dans la Vie Moderne in Paris before commencing a world tour. René Iché created a sculpture Guernica the day after the bombing took place, but will not exhibit it in his lifetime. The Spanish Government pavilion at the International Exhibition also includes Horacio Ferrer's Madrid 1937 (Black Aeroplanes), Joan Miró's The Reaper and a mercury fountain by Alexander Calder. Vera Mukhina's sculpture Worker and Kolkhoz Woman is also created for the Exhibition.
 May – Stanley Spencer and his wife Hilda are divorced; within a week he marries Patricia Preece who departs on honeymoon to St Ives with her partner Dorothy Hepworth while he resumes relations with Hilda at Cookham.
 July 18 – Große Deutsche Kunstausstellung ("Great German Art Exhibition") opened by Adolf Hitler in the Haus der deutschen Kunst ("House of German Art") in Munich, newly completed to the designs of Paul Troost (d. 1934) to display art of the Third Reich. Hitler has rejected the choices of the original selection jury and placed his personal photographer Heinrich Hoffmann in charge of curating the display, but even so has rejected some of the more experimental paintings.
 July 19 – Entartete Kunst ("Degenerate art") exhibition, mounted by the Nazis, opens in Munich.
 October – Formation in London of the Euston Road School, a private School of Drawing and Painting originally established in Fitzroy Street by William Coldstream, Claude Rogers and Victor Pasmore, and giving name to the group of naturalist artists associated with it.
 December 21 – Premiere of Walt Disney's Snow White and the Seven Dwarfs in the United States, the first full-length animated feature film (concept artist: Albert Hurter).
 The exhibition The Origins and Development of International Independent Art held at the Galerie nationale du Jeu de Paume in Paris brings Chaïm Soutine to prominence.
 Surrealist exhibition Objects and Poems arranged at his newly-opened London Gallery (on Cork Street) by Roland Penrose.
 The Avant-Garde Image Group is founded by Japanese photographer Terushichi Hirai.
 Circle, a manifesto for abstract-constructivist art, is published.
 American painters Paul Cadmus, Jared French and Margaret French (née Hoening) form the PaJaMa photographic collective.
 Statues by Jacob Epstein on Rhodesia House, London, are mutilated.
 1937–1938 – Mussolini has the Ara Pacis Augustae reconstructed in its present location.

Works

Paintings
 Endre Bálint – My Room at the Bindendorfs
 Balthus – The Mountain
 William Coldstream
 On the Map
 Winifred Burger
 Ralston Crawford – Buffalo Grain Elevators
 John Steuart Curry – Ajax
 Salvador Dalí
 The Burning Giraffe
 Couple with Their Heads Full of Clouds (second version)
 Metamorphosis of Narcissus, a surrealist work influenced by the Greek myth of Narcissus
 Swans Reflecting Elephants
 Edwin Dickinson – Composition with Still Life
 Óscar Domínguez – The Infernal Machine
 Max Dupain – Sunbaker
 Arthur Dove – Me and the Moon
 M. C. Escher – woodcuts
 Metamorphosis I
 Still Life and Street, his first impossible reality
 Alberto Giacometti – The Artist's Mother
 Gluck – Medallion
 Herman Otto Hoyer – Am Anfang war das Wort ("In the beginning was the word")
 Gladys Hynes – Private View
 Edwin Boyd Johnson – Airmail (fresco for United States Post Office, Melrose Park, Illinois)
 Frida Kahlo
 The Deceased Dimas
 Me and My Doll
 Memory - the heart
 My Nurse and I
 Self-portrait dedicated to Leon Trotsky between the curtains
 Oskar Kokoschka
 Olda Palkovská
 Self-portrait as a degenerate artist
 Hubert Lanzinger
 The Standard Bearer
 René Magritte
 The Black Flag
 Not to be Reproduced
 On the Threshold of Liberty
 Henri Matisse
 Lady in Blue
 Robe violette et Anémones
 Woman in a Purple Coat
 Yellow Odalisque (second version, Philadelphia Museum of Art)
 Joan Miró
 Naked woman climbing a staircase
 Still Life with Old Shoe
 Aidez l'Espagne
 The Reaper
 Georgia O'Keeffe – Jimson Weed
 Pablo Picasso
 Guernica
 Femme au béret et à la robe quadrillée (Marie-Thérèse Walter)
 The Weeping Woman
 Woman in Hat and Fur Collar
 Amrita Sher-Gil
 Brahmacharis
 Bride's Toilet
 The South Indian Villagers
 Stanley Spencer – Double Nude Portrait: The Artist and his Second Wife
 Edward Wadsworth – The Beached Margin
 Rex Whistler – Dining room mural, Plas Newydd, Anglesey
 Adolf Ziegler – Die vier Elemente ("The Four Elements", triptych)

Photographs
 H. S. Wong – Bloody Saturday (photograph)

Sculptures

 Franz Ehrlich – Gates to Buchenwald concentration camp
 John Gregory – Anthony Wayne
 A. F. Hardiman – Earl Haig Memorial
 René Iché – Guernica
 Charles Keck – Statue of Francis P. Duffy (bronze, Duffy Square, New York City)
 Lee Lawrie – Atlas
 Ronald Moody – Midonz (carved wood head)
 Vera Mukhina – Worker and Kolkhoz Woman
 Edith Barretto Stevens Parsons – Frog Baby Fountain

Awards
 Archibald Prize: Normand Baker – Self Portrait

Births
 January 21 – Sally Soames, born Winkleman, English photographer (d.2019)
 February 11 – Mauro Staccioli, Italian sculptor (d. 2018)
 March 11 – Hossein Zenderoudi, Iranian artist
 March 23 – Parviz Tanavoli, Iranian-born sculptor
 March 27 – Thomas Aquinas Daly, American painter
 May 31 – Larry Zox, American painter and printmaker (d.2006)
 June 7 – Red Grooms, born Charles Rogers Grooms, American multimedia pop artist
 June 27 – Alona Frankel, Polish-born Israeli writer, illustrator
 July 9 – David Hockney, English painter
 August 2 – John Salt, English painter
 August 18 – Willie Rushton, English cartoonist, satirist, comedian, actor and performer (d.1996)
 September 1 – Allen Jones, English pop art sculptor and painter
 October 1 – Larry Poons, Japanese-born American op artist
 October 6 – Fritz Scholder, Native American painter, printmaker and graphic artist (d.2005)
 October 12 – Robert Mangold, American minimalist painter
 October 19 – Peter Max, German-born American printmaker and graphic designer
 December 16 – Edward Ruscha, American painter, printmaker, photographer and conceptual artist
 full date unknown – Ronald Davis, American painter

Deaths
 January 29 – Marc-Aurèle de Foy Suzor-Coté, Canadian painter and sculptor (b. 1869)
 February 11 – Suzette Holten, Danish painter and ceramist (born 1863)
 February 18 – Joseph Ehrismann, German-born painter and stained-glass maker (born 1880)
 February 28 – Harrington Mann, Scottish-born portrait painter and decorative artist in the United States (b. 1864)
 March 9 – Alfred Flechtheim, German-born art dealer, collector and publisher (b. 1878)
 March 12 – Eveleen Tennant Myers, English portrait photographer (b. 1856)
 April 19 – Martin Conway, English art critic (b. 1856)
 May – Peter Waals, Dutch-born furniture designer (b. 1870)
 July 26 – Gerda Taro, German-born photographer, killed in Spanish Civil War (b. 1910)
 October 29 – Élie Faure, French art historian (b. 1873)
 November 6 – Colin Campbell Cooper, American painter (b. 1856)
 November 11 – Helen Thornycroft, English painter (b. 1848)
 December 5 – János Thorma, Hungarian Post-Impressionist painter (b. 1870)
 December 6
 Francis Cadell, Scottish Colourist painter (b. 1883)
 Florence Griswold, American curator (b. 1850)

See also
 1937 in fine arts of the Soviet Union

References

 
Years of the 20th century in art
1930s in art